Edouard Perris full name Jean-Pierre Omer Anne Edouard Perris (1808 in Pau – 1878 in Mont-de-Marsan) was a French explorer and entomologist who specialised in Coleoptera and to a lesser extent Diptera and other orders.
He was Chef de division à la préfecture des Landes. Perris was a Member of Société Entomologique de France.
His collection is held by École nationale supérieure agronomique de Montpellier  excepting Cicindelidae, Carabini und Lebiini which are held by Museum Dax, Landes.

Works
partial list (prolific author)
Perris, E. (1839) Notice sur quelques Diptères nouveaux. Annales de la Société Entomologique de France 8: 47-57.
Perris, E. (1840) Observations sur les insectes que habitant les galles de l'Ulex nanus et du Papaver dubium. Annales de la Société Entomologique de France 9:89-99.	
Perris, E. (1841) Observations sur les insectes qui vivent dans la galle de l'ortie dioïque, Urtica dioica L. Annales de la Société Entomologique de France 9:401-406
Perris, E. (1847). Notes pour servir à l'histoire des Ceratopogon. Annales de la Société Entomologique de France (2) 5:555-569.
Perris, E. (1855) Histoire des métamorphoses de divers insectes (Liodes castanea, Cryptohypnus riparius, Ebaeus albifrons, Lagria lata, etc.). Memoires de la Société Scientifique de Leige, 10, 233–280.
Perris, E. (1857). Nouvelles excursions dans les Grandes Landes, Hémiptères. Annales de al Societe Linneenne de Lyon (n.s.) 4: 3-184.
Perris, E. (1870). Histoire des Insectes du Pin maritime. Diptères. Annales de la Société Entomologique de France (2) 5:555 (4) 10:135-232, pls. 1-5
Perris, É. (1876)  Nouvelles promenades entomologiques. Annales de la Société Entomologique de France (5) 6:177-244
Perris, E. (1877) Larves de Coléoptères. Annales de la Société Linnéenne de Lyon 22: 259-418

References

Anonym 1878 [Perris, J. O. A. E.] The Entomologist's Monthly Magazine, Third Series, London 14, pp. 263
Constantin, R. 1992: Memorial des Coléopteristes Français. Bulletin de liaison de l'Association des Coléoptéristes de la région parisienne, Paris (Suppl. 14), S. 1-92, pp. 71
Lhoste, J. 1987: Les entomologistes français. 1750 - 1950. INRA (Institut National de la Recherche Agronomique), 1-355 S., B15: A 1036, pp. 147, Portr., 266-268

French entomologists
Dipterists
1808 births
1878 deaths